In enzymology, an inositol-tetrakisphosphate 5-kinase is an enzyme that catalyzes the chemical reaction

ATP + 1D-myo-inositol 1,3,4,6-tetrakisphosphate  ADP + 1D-myo-inositol 1,3,4,5,6-pentakisphosphate

Thus, the two substrates of this enzyme are ATP and 1D-myo-inositol 1,3,4,6-tetrakisphosphate, whereas its two products are ADP and 1D-myo-inositol 1,3,4,5,6-pentakisphosphate.

This enzyme belongs to the family of transferases, specifically those transferring phosphorus-containing groups (phosphotransferases) with an alcohol group as acceptor.  The systematic name of this enzyme class is ATP:1D-myo-inositol-1,3,4,6-tetrakisphosphate 5-phosphotransferase. This enzyme is also called 1D-myo-inositol-tetrakisphosphate 5-kinase.  This enzyme participates in inositol phosphate metabolism and phosphatidylinositol signaling system.

References

 
 

EC 2.7.1
Enzymes of unknown structure